Lieutenant General Aung Zaw Aye is a Burmese military officer.

Military career 
Aung Zaw Aye has been reshuffled several times throughout his military career. He previously served as the commander of Bureau of Special Operations No. 2 and inspector general.

In the aftermath of the 2021 Myanmar coup d'état, Aung Zaw Aye led efforts to dissuade major ethnic armed organisations from joining the resistance movement and the National Unity Government. In April 2021, he and Yar Pyae met with United Wa State Army and the Shan State Progress Party to maintain relations with the Burmese military.

In March 2022, he was sanctioned by the European Union for committing military atrocities and abuses, particularly for his culpability in the Mo So massacre in December 2021.

In February 2023, he was appointed Chief Minister of Shan State.

See also 

 2021 Myanmar coup d'état
 State Administration Council
 Tatmadaw

References 

Living people
Burmese generals
Defence Services Academy alumni
Year of birth missing (living people)